Lise Mayer (born November 1959) is an American television and film writer, best known as, alongside Rik Mayall and Ben Elton, a creator and co-writer of the BBC comedy series The Young Ones.

Background and work
Mayer was born in Chicago, Illinois, to David and Anne Mayer. She met Rik Mayall when she was at school in Manchester and Mayall came to study drama at Manchester University, where her father was a professor. Her mother is a theatre publicist. In addition to The Young Ones, she has written for television programmes including The Last Resort, Paramount City, London Underground, The Fast Show, Saturday Zoo and Casualty, and produced Denis Leary's No Cure For Cancer.

She was a writer/consultant for the film The Borrowers, and co writer of Suite 16, Paper Marriage, Flushed Away and The Matchmaker. Books include Bachelor Boys: The Young Ones Book, People I Have Shot (with ITN cameraman Sebastian Rich), The Utterly Merry Comic Relief Christmas Book, Go to Bed With Jonathan Ross, Amassed Hysteria and In Search of Happiness (with Angus Deayton). She is an activist and filmmaker for the advocacy group The Citizens.

Personal life

Mayer was in a relationship until 1985 with Rik Mayall, including the period when they co-wrote The Young Ones. She has a son, Isaac, with comedian and television presenter Angus Deayton, with whom she was in a relationship from 1991 to 2015. Her sister, Catherine Mayer, co founded the Women's Equality Party with Sandi Toksvig.

References

External links
 
 BBC Comedy Guide - The Young Ones

1957 births
Living people
Alumni of the University of Manchester
American expatriates in the United Kingdom
20th-century American Jews
American women television writers
Writers from Chicago
British surrealist writers
Jewish surrealist writers
Women surrealist artists
Surrealist artists
21st-century American Jews